is an English contract law case concerning interpretation of contracts. It creates a so-called "red ink" rule, that there is no limit to verbal rearrangement that the court may deploy to give a commercial sensible meaning when construing a contract in its bargaining context. It also, importantly, reaffirmed the rule of English law, that pre-contractual negotiations were ordinarily inadmissible when construing a contract.

Facts
Persimmon agreed to get planning permission, build some residences on Chartbrook’s land at 1 to 9 Hardwicks Way, Wandsworth, and then sell the properties. Chartbrook would pay for it, subject to a balancing payment or ‘additional residential payment’ (ARP) defined as ‘23.4% of the price achieved for each residential unit in excess of the minimum guaranteed residential unit value less the costs and incentives.’ This would be paid by Persimmon to Chartbrook. Chartbrook calculated this to mean £4,484,862 but Persimmon said on a proper construction the amount was £897,051. Persimmon argued that even if they were wrong on construction of the document, rectification should be granted, and if not their pre-contractual negotiations should be taken into account. Chartbrook argued the precontractual negotiations were inadmissible.

The High Court and Court of Appeal agreed with Chartbrook's interpretation. Persimmon Ltd appealed on the interpretation given and argued that if they failed on those grounds, the contract should be construed in light of previous negotiations, or that the court should allow for the document to be rectified, because it was clear that the intentions of the parties was different from that found. Accordingly, it contended that the rule in Prenn v Simmonds that pre contractual negotiations should be ignored, was an illogical rule and should be overturned.

Judgment
The House of Lords held that Persimmon’s interpretation was right, and the amount due was £897,051. There was no limit to the ‘red ink’ that the court could use to correct the verbiage when it was clear that in its commercial context, an agreement could not make sense. The only requirement was that it should be clear to a reasonable person what was meant. It was rejected that pre-contractual negotiations should be taken into account. If they had not so held, they would have granted rectification. Lord Hoffmann said the following.

Lord Hope, Lord Rodge, and Lord Walker agreed.

Baroness Hale agreed with the result, but also said the following.

See also

English contract law

Notes

References

English contract case law
House of Lords cases
2009 in case law
2009 in British law